The Phenomenal Nora Aunor is the last non-holiday studio album by Filipino singer-actress Nora Aunor from 1970 released by Alpha Records Corporation in the Philippines in LP format and later released in 1999 in a compilation/ cd format. The album contains 12 tracks including some her most famous songs like Yesterday When I was Young, Forever Loving You and Tomorrow's Love.

Track listing

Side one

Side two

Album Credits 
Arranged and Conducted by:

 Doming Valdez
 Forever Loving You
 Yesterday When I was young
 Look at the Rain
 Tomorrows Love
 This is How My World is Made
 Two People
 Danny Subido
 Cry Cry No More
 Am I that Easy to Forget
 Im so Happy
 It is No Secret

Arranged and Supervised by:
 Danny Subido
 Missing You
 Prisoner of My Eyes

Recording Supervisor
 Jose Mari Gonzales

Recording Engineer
 Ric Santos

References 

Nora Aunor albums
1970 albums